The Barwon Heads Bridge is a road bridge and a separate pedestrian bridge across the Barwon River between Barwon Heads and Ocean Grove, Victoria, Australia. The bridge is the only crossing of the Barwon River between Geelong and the river mouth at Barwon Heads.

History 
The original timber bridge was the longest surviving example of a timber stringer road bridge in Victoria. It was constructed entirely of timber in 1926–1927, and was a "causeway"-type structure, having a low, flat profile, with closely spaced piers. A 2006 condition report determined that the bridge had reached the end of its effective life and should be replaced.

Description 
The new road bridge, which replaced the historic timber bridge, utilised components and design elements of the original Barwon Heads Bridge. The road bridge consists of 34 spans supported by 185 treated timber piles (five timber piles to each pier), galvanised steel I beams and reinforced concrete deck. The piers are spaced to match the original timber bridge.

It is a modern concrete bridge with  spans supported by one pile per pier.

Construction of the bridge began in May 2009 and it was completed and opened to traffic in December 2010.

References

External links
 Bridge Project official webpage
 VicRoads Bridge Project newsletter
 Bridge Project Heritage Permit Application

Road bridges in Victoria (Australia)
Pedestrian bridges in Australia
Bridges completed in 2010
Beam bridges
Bellarine Peninsula
2010 establishments in Australia